Petrovo (Serbian Cyrillic: Петрово) is a town and municipality located in Republika Srpska, an entity of Bosnia and Herzegovina. As of 2013, the town has a population of 2,322 inhabitants, while the municipality has 6,474 inhabitants.

The municipality was formed from parts of the pre-war municipalities of Gračanica and Lukavac (the other parts of the pre-war municipalities are now in the other Bosnian entity of Federation of Bosnia and Herzegovina).

Geography
The municipality is close to Doboj, halfway between Doboj and Tuzla. It is located on the mountain of Ozren.

History
The municipality was formed by Bosnian Serb authorities during the war. Bosnian government never recognised this decision and officially municipality was created after the signing of the Dayton Agreement.  Bosnian Serb authorities also changed the name of the municipality to Petrovo from Bosansko Petrovo Selo. The municipality existed before, however, was dismantled in the 1960s. It belonged to Gračanica and Lukavac as well.

Demographics

Population

Ethnic composition

Settlements
The following villages are constituents of Petrovo municipality:
 Petrovo
 Kakmuž
 Sočkovac
 Karanovac
 Krtova
 Porječina

Culture
The "Saint Nikola Monastery" of the Serbian Orthodox Church is located in the Petrovo municipality.

Twin municipalities – Sister municipalities
  Borovo, Croatia

See also
 Municipalities of Republika Srpska

References

External links
 

Populated places in Petrovo, Bosnia and Herzegovina
Cities and towns in Republika Srpska
Municipalities of Republika Srpska